The 2019 Islands District Council election was held on 24 November 2019 to elect all 10 elected members to the 18-member Islands District Council.

In the historic landslide victory, Islands District Council became the only council where pro-democrats gained the majority of the elected seats but failed to take control of the council due to the 8 ex-officio seats. However, the pro-democrats 7 of the 10 elected seats and ousted DAB legislator Holden Chow from his seat.

Overall election results
Before election:

Change in composition:

References

External links
 Election Results - Overall Results

2019 Hong Kong local elections